Ribeira Grande de Santiago is a concelho (municipality) of Cape Verde. It is situated in the southwestern part of the island of Santiago. Its seat is the city Cidade Velha. Its population was 8,325 at the 2010 census, and its area is 137.3 km2.

Subdivisions
The municipality consists of two freguesias (civil parishes):
Santíssimo Nome de Jesus
São João Baptista

Geography
The municipal territory is mountainous. One of the main streams of the area is Ribeira Grande de Santiago.

History
The municipality was created in 2005, when two parishes of the older Municipality of Praia were separated to become the Municipality of Ribeira Grande de Santiago.

The old city of Ribeira Grande de Santiago (Cidade Velha) is one of the oldest European settlements in Sub-Saharan Africa. It was an important port for the slave trade from West Africa to the Americas. The town has numerous protected significant buildings and ruins.  The city is listed as a UNESCO World Heritage site since 2009.

Demography

Politics
At the federal level, it belongs to the constituency of Santiago South. Since 2008, the Movement for Democracy (MpD) is the ruling party of the municipality. The results of the latest elections, in 2016:

Notes

External links

 ANMCV (Associação Nacional dos Municípios Cabo-Verdianos - National Association of the Capeverdean Municipalities)

 
Municipalities of Cape Verde
Geography of Santiago, Cape Verde
2005 establishments in Cape Verde